The 1880 Scottish Cup Final was the seventh final of the Scottish Cup and the final of the 1879–80 Scottish Cup, the most prestigious knockout football competition in Scotland. The match was played at Cathkin Park in Crosshill (today part of Glasgow) on 21 February 1880 and was watched by a crowd of 4,000 spectators. The final was contested by three-time former champions Queen's Park and Thornliebank who had never won the cup.

Background
Queen's Park reached the final for the fourth time after winning the competition for three consecutive seasons between 1874 and 1876. Prior to the match, both Queen's Park and Vale of Leven had won the Scottish Cup three times, a record at the time.

No team from Renfrewshire had reached the final before Thornliebank in 1880 – their only appearance in the final. The team's previous best run in the competition came in 1877–78 when they lost to Renton in the fifth round.

The match marked the first and only time Queen's Park and Thornliebank met in a competitive fixture.

Route to the final

Queen's Park

Thornliebank

Match details

External links
London Hearts Scottish Football Reports 21 February 1880

References

Scottish Cup Finals
Scottish Cup Final 1880
Scottish Cup Final 1880
Cup
19th century in Glasgow
February 1880 sports events